The 1959 Turkish National League was the first season of the professional nationwide league in Turkey, known as Süper Lig today. The first season consisted of 16 clubs split into two groups: the Kırmızı Grup (Red Group) and Beyaz Grup (White Group), the colours of the Turkish flag. The first season took place in the calendar year of 1959, instead of 1958–59, as the qualifying stages took place in 1958.

Overview 
The top eight clubs from the 1958–59 Istanbul Football League and the top four clubs from the Ankara and İzmir leagues in the 1958–59 season took part in the league. These clubs were Adalet, Beşiktaş, Beykoz, Karagümrük, Fenerbahçe, Galatasaray, İstanbulspor, Vefa (from Istanbul), Ankaragücü, Ankara Demirspor, Gençlerbirliği, Hacettepe (from Ankara), Altay, Göztepe, İzmirspor, and Karşıyaka (from İzmir).

The final consisted of two legs and took place between the winners of each group. Galatasaray won the Red Group and Fenerbahçe won the White Group. Galatasaray won the first leg 1-0, but Fenerbahçe won the second leg 4-0, winning 4-1 on aggregate. The title was Fenerbahçe's first Süper Lig title and 10th Turkish championship title overall, qualifying them for the 1959–60 European Cup. Metin Oktay was top scorer with 11 goals. No clubs were relegated this season.

Red group

Table 
 Results 

White group
 Table

Results

Championship final 
First leg

Second leg

See also 
 1958–59 in Turkish football

References

External links 
 Turkey 1959 (RSSSF)
 Turkey – Final tables (RSSSF)

Turkish National League
1
Turkey